The Delray Beach WCT was a men's tennis tournament played in Delray Beach, Florida in the United States from 1982 to 1983.  The event was part of the WCT Tour and was held on outdoor clay courts.

Finals

Singles

Doubles

External links
 1982 ITF tournament details
 1983 ITF tournament details

World Championship Tennis
Delray Beach WCT
1982 establishments in Florida
1983 disestablishments in Florida
Recurring sporting events established in 1982
Recurring sporting events disestablished in 1983
Sports in Palm Beach County, Florida
Delray Beach, Florida